Remelana is a genus of butterflies in the family Lycaenidae. The species of this genus are found in the Indomalayan realm. Remelana was erected by Frederic Moore in 1884.

Species
Remelana davisi Jumalon, 1975
Remelana jangala (Horsfield, [1829]) - chocolate royal

References

External links

Remelanini
Lycaenidae genera
Taxa named by Frederic Moore